The Walworth County Courthouse, located at 4304 4th Ave. in Selby, South Dakota, is a courthouse for Walworth County, South Dakota which was built in 1911.  It was listed on the National Register of Historic Places in 1999.

It is a three-story structure built of brick, sandstone, and concrete.  Its design is "utilitarian" yet includes Classical Revival details.

The building was designed by the Fall River Company, a Hot Springs-based architecture firm operated by architect John P. Eisentraut.

A jail building completed in 1911 is also included in the listing.  Its design is Late Victorian Romanesque in style.

References

Courthouses on the National Register of Historic Places in South Dakota
Romanesque Revival architecture in South Dakota
Neoclassical architecture in South Dakota
Government buildings completed in 1911
Walworth County, South Dakota
Courthouses in South Dakota